Rutherford Bay is an Arctic waterway in Qikiqtaaluk Region, Nunavut, Canada. It is located at the north end of Rice Strait, near the southern entrance of Kane Basin. Ellesmere Island is to the east.

References

Bays of Qikiqtaaluk Region